Mariposa (Spanish for "Butterfly") is an unincorporated community and census-designated place (CDP) in and the county seat of Mariposa County, California, United States. The population was 1,526 at the 2020 census. The community is named after the flocks of monarch butterflies seen overwintering there by early explorers.

Geography

It lies in the rugged foothills of the Sierra Nevada. Mariposa Creek flows through the town. Soils in the urban area are mostly brown to reddish brown loam of the Blasingame series. A gravelly loam is mapped as the Boomer series. These soils support thick grassland plus trees such as blue oak, black oak, gray pine, and ponderosa pine. To the west-northwest of town is a large area of sparse vegetation and rockland on which is found serpentine soil of the Henneke series.

Highway 49 leads southeast  to end at Oakhurst and northwest the same distance to Coulterville. Highway 140 leads southwest  to Merced in the San Joaquin Valley and northeast  to Yosemite Valley.

The community lies in the valley of Mariposa Creek, which flows south and then southwest into the San Joaquin Valley.

Mariposa County includes much of Yosemite National Park, and a good deal of the local economy is related to the park and to tourism. The two-story county courthouse, constructed in 1854, is the oldest in continuous use west of the Rockies. Tours are available.

The county lies at the southern end of the Mother Lode, and outsiders were attracted to Mariposa by gold. During the 19th century California Gold Rush, its streams were panned and deep mines worked the underground veins. At one time John C. Frémont lived here and owned claims to much of the mineral wealth of Mariposa. He later was the first United States senator from the state, and the first Republican candidate for President.

Climate
According to the Köppen climate classification system, Mariposa has a hot-summer Mediterranean climate (abbreviated "Csa" on climate maps) and wet winters.

History

The town was founded as a mining camp on the banks of a seasonal stream known as Agua Fría. Prior to this, Southern Sierra Miwuk people resided in the area. After a flood during the winter of 1849/50, and fires, the town was moved to the location of today's Mariposa, although mainly due to better terrain and the presence of Mariposa creek, a large producer of placer gold. The gold in small Aqua Fria creek was soon removed, and lacked water most of the year. So the populace moved on to the new boomtown. The large Mariposa mine soon opened, with a 40-foot waterwheel crushing gold ore. This provided a stable source of employment, and Mariposa soon became the supply hub for hundreds of outlying mining districts. Placer gold, that which is found in creekbeds and alluvial deposits, was soon extinguished, and the era of hard rock, deep mining began. In 1851 the "new" town of Mariposa became the county seat of the county of Mariposa, which reached nearly to Los Angeles. By 1854 Mariposa had a grand courthouse which is still in operation. Some refer to lumber being cut from an area to the east of town known as "Logtown", but no maps or certifiable sources can attest to the existence of a place by that name. Most likely the lumber for the courthouse was milled in Midpines, where there was an unusual abundance of sugar pine trees.

John C. Frémont had a Spanish land grant that gave him ownership of most of the Mariposa mining district, but the possibility of securing his property was nearly impossible due to the huge influx of gold seekers, and little or no enforcement from the few law keepers available. In book #1 of Mariposa county records, originally filed in Aqua Fria, on Page 2, there is a claim known as the Spencer quartz mine and adjacent millsite. This claim was just hundreds of feet from Fremont's grant line, and its owners were Lafayette H. Bunnell and Champlain Spencer, who became rather wealthy from the placer gold in Whitlock and Sherlocks creek. They later erected a  waterwheel and steam mill, along with several arrastras. Bunnell later published a memoir of his time in Midpines and entry to the Yosemite Valley, which is still in print today - The Discovery of the Yosemite. Spencer has never been acknowledged as having named Half Dome, a prominent feature in Yosemite Valley. These educated gentlemen and adventurers eventually sold "Spencers Mill" to a French and English conglomerate for a tidy sum. All is quiet now on Spencers mill, but much evidence of a series of mills and the arrastras remain.

The US Army built the Mariposa Auxiliary Field (1942-1945) to train World War II pilots. After the war the airfield became the current Mariposa-Yosemite Airport.

On July 18, 2017, a fast-moving wildfire, the "Detwiler Fire", forced the evacuation of the entire town.

Demographics

2010
At the 2010 census Mariposa had a population of 2,173. The racial makeup of Mariposa was 1,895 (87.2%) White, 10 (0.5%) African American, 105 (4.8%) Native American, 30 (1.4%) Asian, 0 (0.0%) Pacific Islander, 59 (2.7%) from other races, and 74 (3.4%) from two or more races. Hispanic or Latino of any race were 215 people (9.9%).

The census reported that 2,098 people (96.5% of the population) lived in households, 12 (0.6%) lived in non-institutionalized group quarters, and 63 (2.9%) were institutionalized.

There were 1,013 households, 237 (23.4%) had children under the age of 18 living in them, 365 (36.0%) were opposite-sex married couples living together, 140 (13.8%) had a female householder with no husband present, 40 (3.9%) had a male householder with no wife present.  There were 60 (5.9%) unmarried opposite-sex partnerships, and 2 (0.2%) same-sex married couples or partnerships. 413 households (40.8%) were one person and 235 (23.2%) had someone living alone who was 65 or older. The average household size was 2.07.  There were 545 families (53.8% of households); the average family size was 2.77.

The age distribution was 434 people (20.0%) under the age of 18, 130 people (6.0%) aged 18 to 24, 389 people (17.9%) aged 25 to 44, 631 people (29.0%) aged 45 to 64, and 589 people (27.1%) who were 65 or older.  The median age was 49.3 years. For every 100 females, there were 85.7 males.  For every 100 females age 18 and over, there were 83.4 males.

There were 1,143 housing units at an average density of 88.7 per square mile, of the occupied units 529 (52.2%) were owner-occupied and 484 (47.8%) were rented. The homeowner vacancy rate was 3.4%; the rental vacancy rate was 5.8%.  1,082 people (49.8% of the population) lived in owner-occupied housing units and 1,016 people (46.8%) lived in rental housing units.

2000
At the 2000 census there were 1,373 people, 676 households, and 327 families in the CDP. The racial makeup of the CDP was 86.8% White, 0.6% African American, 6.3% Native American, 0.9% Asian, 1.8% from other races, and 3.6% from two or more races. Hispanic or Latino of any race were 5.8%.

Of the 676 households 21.6% had children under the age of 18 living with them, 31.4% were married couples living together, 13.6% had a female householder with no husband present, and 51.5% were non-families. 47.6% of households were one person and 27.1% were one person aged 65 or older.  The average household size was 1.94 and the average family size was 2.77.

The age distribution was 20.6% under the age of 18, 8.2% from 18 to 24, 23.2% from 25 to 44, 21.0% from 45 to 64, and 27.0% 65 or older.  The median age was 42 years. For every 100 females, there were 80.4 males.  For every 100 females age 18 and over, there were 78.7 males.

The median household income was $18,144 and the median family income  was $27,344. Males had a median income of $26,771 versus $26,635 for females. The per capita income for the CDP was $22,436.  About 28.0% of families and 24.0% of the population were below the poverty line, including 34.5% of those under age 18 and 5.5% of those age 65 or over.

Government and public safety

Government representation 
The County is administered by its elected five member County Board of Supervisors.

Policing and public safety 
The policing agency for the county is the Mariposa County Sheriff and staff. Fire protection and emergency medical aid is provided by the Mariposa County Fire Department.

Notable residents
Some living past and present notable residents in alphabetical order include:
 John C. Fremont, first U.S senator from California, first Republican candidate for president and explorer of the West with Kit Carson
 Jon Leicester, baseball pitcher for the Orix Buffaloes, born in Mariposa
 Sal Maccarone, international author and sculptor
 Logan Mankins, guard for New England Patriots football team
 Frederick Law Olmsted, landscape architect
 George Radanovich, politician and author
 Jacoby Shaddix, founding member of rock band Papa Roach, songwriter, and host of MTV Show Scarred
 Paul Vasquez, resident of Mariposa who became famous for filming his ecstatic 2010 viral video Double Rainbow
 Cody Wichmann, offensive guard for Los Angeles Rams football team

References

External links

 Mariposa Storytelling Festival Annual storytelling festival in March
 Mariposa History And Genealogy
 Mariposa Gazette
 Daily News and Photos of Mariposa
 Mariposa's Rockslide - Video
 Mariposa County High School
 Superior Court of Mariposa County
 VisitMariposa.net

Census-designated places in Mariposa County, California
County seats in California
Mining communities of the California Gold Rush
Populated places established in 1849
1849 establishments in California
Census-designated places in California